This is a list of all verifiable organizations that claim to be a Masonic Grand Lodge in Central and South America.

Central and South America

References

See also 
List of Masonic Grand Lodges

Lists of organizations